John Sherwood (born 4 June 1945 in Selby, West Riding of Yorkshire, England) is a male retired British athlete.

Athletics career
Sherwood won the bronze medal in the Olympic Games in Mexico City in 1968 for the 400 m hurdles. His time was 49.03 seconds, and he was third behind fellow British athlete David Hemery, who took gold, and German Gerhard Hennige (silver). The commentator, David Coleman, who in his great excitement after Hemery won, made the rather unfortunate remark "who cares who's third - it doesn't matter!" It was an early example of so-called Colemanballs.

Sherwood also won a silver medal in the European Athletics Championships in 1969 and a gold medal in the Commonwealth Games in 1970. He also represented England in the 400 metres hurdles event, at the 1966 Commonwealth Games and the 1974 British Commonwealth Games in Christchurch, New Zealand.

He was a regular on the popular BBC sports programme The Superstars in the '70s and early '80s and in 1980 came 2nd in the World Superstars Final in America. He had to turn professional to compete in the 100 metres of the 1980 UK grand final of the programme, as he would not have been able to keep his amateur status if he competed. He had the option not to run but chose to.

Personal life
He studied at the Loughborough College of Education and is married to Sheila Sherwood, who won a silver medal at the same Olympics in the long jump. In his closing address in the successful bid for the 2012 Olympic Games in London, Lord Coe described how as a youngster in Sheffield in 1968, John and Sheila Sherwood had inspired him to pursue his successful career in track athletics.

He is the father of tennis player David Sherwood, a member of the British Davis Cup team. He is also the brother of Steve Sherwood, the former Chelsea and Watford goalkeeper.

After 40 years of teaching PE, 37 of those at Firth Park Community Arts College, Sheffield, John retired in 2006 after a finale school sports day on 12 July at the Don Valley Stadium which was closed with an address from Lord Coe.

References

External links
 European Championships Past Results

1945 births
Living people
People from Selby
Athletes from Yorkshire
English male hurdlers
Olympic athletes of Great Britain
Olympic bronze medallists for Great Britain
Commonwealth Games gold medallists for England
Athletes (track and field) at the 1968 Summer Olympics
Athletes (track and field) at the 1972 Summer Olympics
Commonwealth Games medallists in athletics
Athletes (track and field) at the 1966 British Empire and Commonwealth Games
Athletes (track and field) at the 1970 British Commonwealth Games
European Athletics Championships medalists
Alumni of Loughborough University
Medalists at the 1968 Summer Olympics
Olympic bronze medalists in athletics (track and field)
Universiade medalists in athletics (track and field)
Universiade silver medalists for Great Britain
Medalists at the 1967 Summer Universiade
Medallists at the 1970 British Commonwealth Games